The Argentine Episcopal Conference is an episcopal conference of the Roman Catholic Church of Argentina that gathers the bishops of the country in order to discuss pastoral issues and in general all matters that have to do with the Church. The following are members of the Conference:

 The diocesan bishops and others considered such de jure;
 The coadjutor bishops;
 The auxiliary bishops;
 The Eastern Catholic bishops with a see in Argentina;
 The titular bishops by appointment of the Holy See or the Conference itself;

Guests of the Conference are the Apostolic Nuncio and other bishops (titular and emeritus).

See also
 Roman Catholicism in Argentina
 Christianity in Argentina

References

External links
 Conferencia Episcopal Argentina - Official website (in Spanish).

Catholic Church in Argentina
Argentina